Mostafa Naeijpour (born March 23, 1993) is an Iranian footballer who plays as a defender who currently plays for Iranian club Naft Masjed Soleyman in the Persian Gulf Pro League.

Club career

Saipa
He made his debut for Saipa in 12th fixtures of 2017–18 Iran Pro League against Naft Tehran while he substituted in for Mohammad Abbaszadeh.

References

Living people
1993 births
Association football defenders
Iranian footballers
Saipa F.C. players
People from Nowshahr
Sportspeople from Mazandaran province
21st-century Iranian people